Arthur Seidl (8 June 1863 – 11 April 1928) was a German writer, journalist, teacher at the Leipzig Conservatory and  Dramaturg at the Hoftheater Dessau. 

Born in Munich, Seidl studied at the universities of Munich, Tübingen, Berlin and Leipzig, completing his studies with a doctor's degree. During his studies, he also learned to play cello and piano in Munich and Regensburg, and was interested in composition.

From 1898 to 1899 he was at the Nietzsche-Archiv in Weimar and won a reputation as a Wagner scholar. From 1903 he was dramaturge at the Hoftheater Dessau (Dessau court theatre), a position he held until his death. From 1904 he was also a lecturer at the Konservatorium Leipzig.

Selected works 
 Zur Geschichte des Erhabenheitsbegriffes seit Kant (1889)

Literature

 Ludwig Frankenstein: Arthur Seidl. Ein Lebensabriß. Bosse, Regensburg 1913

19th-century German writers
19th-century German male writers
20th-century German writers
Dramaturges
1863 births
1928 deaths